Neotripterifordin is an anti-viral diterpene lactone isolated from Tripterygium wilfordii.

References

External links
 Anti-AIDS agents--XIX. Neotripterifordin, a novel anti-HIV principle from Tripterygium wilfordii: isolation and structural elucidation
Antiviral drugs
Diterpenes
Lactones
Tertiary alcohols
Cyclopentanes